Nakanishi (written: 中西 or 仲西) is a Japanese surname. Notable people with the surname include:

 Akinori Nakanishi (born 1954), chief designer for Mitsubishi Motors
 Alan Nakanishi (born 1940), American politician
 Chieko Nakanishi (born 1966), Japanese former volleyball player
 Eisuke Nakanishi (born 1973), Japanese football player
 Etsuko Nakanishi (born 1977), Japanese drummer, Shonen Knife
, Japanese voice actress
 Hidetoshi Nakanishi (born 1958), Japanese judoka
 Hiroaki Nakanishi (1946–2021), CEO of Hitachi
 Kazuo Nakanishi (1922–2003), leader of the Yamaguchi-gumi yakuza syndicate
, Japanese politician
Kie Nakanishi (born 1995), Japanese badminton player
 Koji Nakanishi (born 1925), Japanese chemist
 Machiko Nakanishi (born 1976), Japanese athlete
 Manabu Nakanishi (born 1967), Japanese wrestler
 Maya Nakanishi (born 1985), Japanese paralympic athlete
 Michi Nakanishi (1913–1991), Japanese athlete
 Mitsuo Nakanishi (born 1948), Japanese sprint canoer
 Momoe Nakanishi (born 1980), Japanese wrestler
 Nobuaki Nakanishi, Japanese anime director
 Rei Nakanishi (born 1938), Japanese novelist and songwriter
 Shigeru Nakanishi (born 1946), Japanese artist
 Shigetada Nakanishi (born 1942), Japanese scientist
 Susumu Nakanishi (born 1929), scholar of Japanese literature
 Tamaki Nakanishi (born 1976), Japanese voice actress
 Taeko Nakanishi (born 1931), Japanese voice actress
, Japanese freestyle skier
 Tayuka Nakanishi, Japanese fashion designer
 Tetsuo Nakanishi (born 1969), Japanese football player
, Japanese football player
 Toshio Nakanishi (born 1956), Japanese musician and graphic designer
 Yuko Nakanishi (born 1981) Japanese swimmer
 Yousuke Nakanishi (born 1979), Japanese badminton player

See also
8702 Nakanishi, a main-belt asteroid

Japanese-language surnames